Vidya Krishnan is a health-focused Indian investigative journalist and author, based in Montreal.  

Krishnan reported that she was the survivor of sexual harassment at India Today in 2018 and received online abuse and death threats due to her reporting about the COVID-19 pandemic in 2021.

She comes from a tamil brahmin family and is known for her book about Phantom Plague: How Tuberculosis Shaped our History.

Career 
Krishnan started her career in 2003 at The Pioneer newspaper. As a freelance journalist, she regularly writes for Foreign Policy, The Caravan, and The Atlantic, and was previously the health editor for The Hindu. 

She has reported on issues including the Rohingya genocide, tuberculosis, the right to health movement, and ethical standards in Indian clinical trials of pharmaceutical drugs.

In 2020, after years of health reporting, Krishnan spoke about navigating high levels of online harassment while reporting on COVID-19 including receiving death and rape threats.

Throughout 2021, Krishnan was critical of Indian Prime Minister Narendra Modi's response to the COVID-19 pandemic in India. She spoke about how the pandemic is disproportionately affecting poor people, and that the response is not led by scientists.

Krishnan delivered the Dr C.V.S. Sarma Memorial Lecture at the University of Hyderabad in November 2021, titled Science Denialism & Democracy.

Selected publications 

 Vidya Krishnan, 2022, Phantom Plague: How Tuberculosis Shaped our History, PublicAffairs, ISBN 9781541768468

Awards 
Krishnan won a Nieman Fellowship from Harvard University to study the impact of behavioral economics on antibiotic use, with a specific focus on self-medication and antibiotic resistance.

In 2017, she received the International Health Media Fellowships award. She has won the Oxford University's global health journalism fellowship, a National Press Foundation fellowship, and McGill University's global health media scholarship.

References 

Living people
Canadian journalists
Indian journalists
Investigative journalists
Harvard University alumni
McGill University alumni
Nieman Fellows
The Atlantic (magazine) people
The Hindu journalists
India Today people
21st-century Indian non-fiction writers
Indian emigrants to Canada
21st-century Indian journalists
21st-century Indian women writers
Year of birth missing (living people)